The Imperial Order of the White Eagle was an Imperial Russian Order based on the Polish honor. Emperor Nicholas I of Russia established the award in 1831 as the Imperial and Royal Order of the White Eagle. A recipient of the Order was granted the title Knight of the Imperial (and Royal) Order of the White Eagle.

Background

The "white eagle" has been associated with Poland even prior to statehood; first appearing on the Polish Coat of Arms in the 13th century. The original Order of the White Eagle was reputedly established by King Władysław I in 1325. There is no evidence of it being awarded, however, until 1705 under Augustus II the Strong, King of the Polish–Lithuanian Commonwealth.

After the Third Partition of Poland in 1795, the Order of the White Eagle briefly disappeared along with the Polish monarchy. After his death in 1798, Empress Alexandra wore the Collar of the Grand Master of the Order at Nicholas’s coronation as King of Poland. The order was resurrected in 1807 by Napoleon I in his short-lived Duchy of Warsaw. 

In 1815, the Congress of Vienna divided the historically Polish lands among Prussia, the Austrian Empire and the Russian Empire. The majority of the territory was renamed the Kingdom of Poland and was to be an autonomous part of the Russian Empire. 

The Order of the White Eagle is mentioned as belonging to the Kingdom of Poland in its constitution of 1815: 

During the years immediately following the Congress of Vienna, the badge and cross of the Order were awarded with the same Polish insignia, but the majority of the recipients were Russians or members of the Austrian Empire.

After Russian troops put down the Polish uprising of 1830-31, Nicholas I stripped the autonomy from the Kingdom of Poland and adopted all Polish orders of merit.

Order within the Russian Empire

The Order of the White Eagle was officially "annexed" by Nicholas I on 17 November 1831 and became part of the Russian Imperial honors system. Among the first recipients of the Imperial Order of the White Eagle were Ivan Paskevich and Pyotr Petrovich Palen, recognised for their part in suppressing the Polish uprising.

The new design featured significant alterations: the badge was now of gold and red enamel; on the front, the original red maltese cross and white eagle were reduced in size and superimposed over the double-headed eagle of the Russian Empire. The back of the badge featured the original Polish badge design, superimposed over the Russian imperial eagle. The star now featured the Russian royal crown.  

On 25 January 1832, a blue ribbon and sash were introduced.

The Order of the White Eagle was given a high status in the hierarchy of distinction, ranked only behind the Order of Saint Andrew, the Order of Saint Catherine (for women only) and the Order of Saint Alexander Nevsky. As the top three awards were named after Russian Orthodox saints, the Order of the White Eagle was the preferred award to bestow upon non-Christians. It granted hereditary nobility.

Recipients 

 Alexander Abaza
 'Abd al-Ahad Khan
 Count Nikolay Adlerberg
 Adolphus Frederick V, Grand Duke of Mecklenburg-Strelitz
 Ahmad Shah Qajar
 Albert I of Belgium
 Prince Albert of Prussia (1809–1872)
 Archduke Albrecht, Duke of Teschen
 Albert, Prince Consort
 Yevgeni Ivanovich Alekseyev
 Alexander III of Russia
 Alexander Nikolaevich Golitsyn
 Alexander of Battenberg
 Prince Alexander of Hesse and by Rhine
 Duke Alexander of Oldenburg
 Grand Duke Alexei Alexandrovich of Russia
 Grand Duke Alexei Mikhailovich of Russia
 Alexei Nikolaevich, Tsarevich of Russia
 Alfred, 2nd Prince of Montenuovo
 Gyula Andrássy
 Ippolit Andreev
 Avraamy Aslanbegov
 August Gyldenstolpe
 Prince August, Duke of Dalarna
 Prince August of Württemberg
 Theodor Avellan
 Count Kasimir Felix Badeni
 Ivane Bagration of Mukhrani
 Pyotr Romanovich Bagration
 Alexander Barclay de Tolly-Weymarn
 Vasili Bebutov
 Alexander von Benckendorff (diplomat)
 Bhanurangsi Savangwongse
 Nikolai Bibikov
 Aleksei Birilev
 Otto von Bismarck
 Georgy Bobrikov
 Nikolay Bobrikov
 Woldemar von Boeckmann
 Władysław Grzegorz Branicki
 Charles James Briggs
 Pavel Bulgakov
 Prince Carl, Duke of Västergötland
 Carlos I of Portugal
 Charles XV
 Alexander Chavchavadze
 Christian IX of Denmark
 Mikhail Pavlovich Danilov
 Dmitry Dashkov
 Charles de Broqueville
 Rudolf von Delbrück
 Ivan Delyanov
 Dmitry Petrovich Dokhturov
 Mikhail Drozdovsky
 Fyodor Dubasov
 John Lambton, 1st Earl of Durham
 Alexander Alexandrovich Dushkevich
 Edward VII
 Ernest Louis, Grand Duke of Hesse
 Nikolai Ottovich von Essen
 Archduke Eugen of Austria
 Aleksei Evert
 Ferdinand I of Bulgaria
 Ferdinand II of Portugal
 Archduke Ferdinand Karl Joseph of Austria-Este
 Giustino Fortunato (1777–1862)
 Francis IV, Duke of Modena
 Franz Joseph I of Austria
 Archduke Franz Karl of Austria
 Frederick VIII of Denmark
 Frederick Francis III, Grand Duke of Mecklenburg-Schwerin
 Frederick I, Grand Duke of Baden
 Archduke Friedrich, Duke of Teschen
 Ivan Fullon
 Ivan Ganetsky
 George V
 Aleksandr Gerngross
 Fyodor Logginovich van Heiden
 Alexander von Güldenstubbe
 Grigory Golitsyn
 Vladimir Gorbatovsky
 Oskar Gripenberg
 Iosif Gurko
 Gustaf V
 Gustaf VI Adolf
 Ferenc Gyulay
 Haakon VII of Norway
 Lodewijk van Heiden
 Prince Heinrich of Hesse and by Rhine
 Dmitry Horvat
 Alexander Ievreinov
 Illarion Vasilchikov
 Alexander Imeretinsky
 Maurice Janin
 Archduke John of Austria
 Prince Johann of Schleswig-Holstein-Sonderburg-Glücksburg
 Joseph, Duke of Saxe-Altenburg
 Georg von Kameke
 Kyprian Kandratovich
 Karl Anton, Prince of Hohenzollern
 Prince Karl Theodor of Bavaria
 Nikolai Kashtalinsky
 Alexander von Kaulbars
 Gustav von Kessel
 Grand Duke Konstantin Konstantinovich of Russia
 Grand Duke Konstantin Nikolayevich of Russia
 Konstantin Poltoratsky
 Konstantin of Hohenlohe-Schillingsfürst
 Apostol Kostanda
 Alexander Krivoshein
 Aleksey Kuropatkin
 Karl Lambert
 Sergey Stepanovich Lanskoy
 Leonid Lesh
 Leopold II of Belgium
 Alexander Mikhailovich Lermontov
 George Maximilianovich, 6th Duke of Leuchtenberg
 Sergei Georgievich, 8th Duke of Leuchtenberg
 Kazimir Vasilevich Levitsky
 Louis IV, Grand Duke of Hesse
 Prince Louis of Battenberg
 Alexander von Lüders
 Archduke Ludwig Viktor of Austria
 Luís I of Portugal
 Alexey Manikovsky
 Manuel II of Portugal
 Friedrich Martens
 Esma'il Mass'oud
 Maximilian I of Mexico
 Duke William of Mecklenburg-Schwerin
 Samad bey Mehmandarov
 Emmanuel von Mensdorff-Pouilly
 Feofil Egorovich Meyendorf
 Grand Duke Michael Nikolaevich of Russia
 Grand Duke Michael Alexandrovich of Russia
 Konstantin Mikhaylovsky
 Milan I of Serbia
 Min Young-hwan
 Mikhail Mirkovich
 Sayyid Mir Muhammad Alim Khan
 Alexander von Moller
 Helmuth von Moltke the Elder
 Huseyn Khan Nakhchivanski
 Pavel Nakhimov
 Napoleon III
 Kamran Mirza Nayeb es-Saltaneh
 Nicholas II of Russia
 Nicholas Alexandrovich, Tsesarevich of Russia
 Grand Duke Nicholas Nikolaevich of Russia (1831–1891)
 Arkady Nikanorovich Nishenkov
 Vladimir Nikolayevich Nikitin
 August Ludwig von Nostitz
 Nikolai Obolensky
 David Ivanovich Orlov
 Oscar II
 Archduke Otto of Austria (1865–1906)
 Otto of Bavaria
 Alexander August Wilhelm von Pape
 Honório Hermeto Carneiro Leão, Marquis of Paraná
 José Paranhos, Viscount of Rio Branco
 Ivan Paskevich
 Grand Duke Paul Alexandrovich of Russia
 Duke Paul Frederick of Mecklenburg
 Pedro V of Portugal
 Duke Peter of Oldenburg
 Prince Philippe, Count of Flanders
 Mikhail Mikhailovich Pleshkov
 Karl von Plettenberg
 Mohammad Ali Shah Qajar
 Mohammad Shah Qajar
 Mohammad Taqi Mirza Rokn ed-Dowleh
 Mozaffar ad-Din Shah Qajar
 Naser al-Din Shah Qajar
 Fyodor Radetsky
 Antoni Wilhelm Radziwiłł
 Christopher Roop
 Prince Rudolf of Liechtenstein
 Rudolf, Crown Prince of Austria
 Adam Rzhevusky
 John Salmond
 Anton Yegorovich von Saltza
 Alexander Samsonov
 Pavel Savvich
 Johan Eberhard von Schantz
 Sergei Sheydeman
 Yakov Schkinsky
 Emil von Schlitz
 Gustav von Senden-Bibran
 Grand Duke Sergei Alexandrovich of Russia
 Maximilian Seyssel d'Aix
 Ivan Ivanovich Shamshev
 Ivan Shestakov
 Dmitry Shuvayev
 Arkady Skugarevsky
 Vladimir Vasilyevich Smirnov
 Mikhail Sokovin
 Hermann von Spaun
 Archduke Stephen of Austria (Palatine of Hungary)
 Pyotr Stolypin
 Vladimir Sukhomlinov
 Dmitry Ivanovich Sviatopolk-Mirsky
 Ludwig Freiherr von und zu der Tann-Rathsamhausen
 Arshak Ter-Gukasov
 Alfred von Tirpitz
 Richard Ernest William Turner
 Uchiyama Kojirō
 Paul Simon Unterberger
 Prince Valdemar of Denmark
 Sergei Vasilchikov
 Georgy Vasmund
 Julius von Verdy du Vernois
 Anthony Veselovsky
 Charles Vilain XIIII
 Grand Duke Vladimir Alexandrovich of Russia
 Grand Duke Vladimir Kirillovich of Russia
 Illarion Vorontsov-Dashkov
 Wilhelm II, German Emperor
 William II of Württemberg
 Sergei Witte
 Vasily Zavoyko
 Mass'oud Mirza Zell-e Soltan
 Ferdinand von Zeppelin
 Yakov Zhilinsky
 Dmitry Zuyev

See also

 Order of the White Eagle (Poland)
 Order of the White Eagle (Serbia)

References 

White Eagle, Order of the
White Eagle, Order of the
White Eagle, Order of the
White Eagle, Order of the
White Eagle, Order of the
White Eagle, Order of the
White Eagle, Order of the